The finances of the Church of Jesus Christ of Latter-day Saints (LDS Church) are not a matter of public record. In the absence of official statements, people interested in knowing the church's financial status and behavior, including both members of the church and people outside the church, have attempted to estimate or guess. According to the church, their funding comes from the donations of its members and the principal expense is in constructing and maintaining facilities.

When the LDS Church takes in more donations than it pays out in period expenses, it uses the surplus to build a reserve for capital expenditures and for future years when period expenses may exceed donations. The church invests its reserve to maintain the principal and generate a reasonable return and directs its investments into income-producing assets that may help it in its mission, such as farmland- and communication-related companies and the City Creek Center (see below).

The LDS Church has not publicly disclosed its financial statements in the United States since 1959. The church does disclose its financials in the United Kingdom and Canada where it is required to do so by law. In the UK, these financials are audited by the UK office of PricewaterhouseCoopers.

The LDS Church maintains an internal audit department that provides its certification at each annual general conference that contributions are collected and spent in accordance with established church policy. In addition, the church engages a public accounting firm (currently Deloitte) to perform annual audits in the United States of its not-for-profit, for-profit, and some educational entities.

History 

In the 1880s and '90s, the LDS Church fell into severe financial distress due to several factors that were exacerbated by the nationwide economic depression that began with the Panic of 1893.

Under the provisions of the anti-polygamy Edmunds–Tucker Act of 1887 which were upheld in the 1890 Supreme Court ruling Late Corporation of the Church of Jesus Christ of Latter-Day Saints v. United States, the U.S. government had confiscated LDS Church property, including tithing money donated by members (real estate such as churches and temples was never seized, though the Edmund-Tucker act allowed for such seizures). Additionally, the LDS Church had borrowed extensively to finance a variety of infrastructural developments such as gristmills and after the 1893 financial crisis the LDS Church was unable to make timely payments on their loans. Wilford Woodruff, church president from 1889 to 1898, privately expressed doubt that the church would ever pay its debts. Eventually the LDS Church obtained the backing of investment bank Kuhn, Loeb & Co. to issue bonds backed by the labor of Utah residents.

By the time Lorenzo Snow became church president in 1898, the church was $2.3 million in debt. Snow reemphasized the payment of tithing (giving 10% of one's income to the church) and by 1907 the church was completely out of debt and since then has not used debt to fund its operations, even for capital projects. An early pioneer venture of the LDS Church was ZCMI which lasted from 1868 to divesting ZCMI Center Mall in 2007.

During the late 1950s and early 1960s, the church greatly increased spending on buildings under the leadership of Henry Moyle. Moyle's reasoning was that by building larger meetinghouses the church would attract more converts. The accelerated building program led to a $32 million deficit in 1962. It was Moyle who convinced David O. McKay to discontinue publishing an annual financial statement in order to hide the extent of the spending. Eventually, McKay relieved Moyle from his administrative responsibilities and spending was reined in.

Moyle is also responsible for acquiring what is today one of the church's most valuable properties: the Deseret Cattle and Citrus Ranch. Another highly profitable asset is the Polynesian Cultural Center that became one of Hawaii's most popular tourist attractions under the leadership of Howard W. Hunter during the 1960s and 1970s.

Current source of funding 

According to the Church, most of its revenues come in the form of tithes and fast offerings contributed by church members. Tithing donations are used to support operations of the church, including construction and maintenance of buildings and other facilities, and are transferred from local units directly to church headquarters in Salt Lake City, where the funds are centrally managed. It is estimated that about ten percent of its funding also comes from income on its investments, mostly direct investments.

Fast offerings donations are used to assist both church members and non-members in need.  As part of the church's welfare program, the funds may be used to stock a local Bishop's Storehouse or food bank to assist in caring for those in need.

An independent analysis from 2012 estimates that the Church brings in approximately $7 billion annually in tithes and other donations.

Tithing outside the United States
Financial Records are required by law to be reported in some countries such as Australia, the United Kingdom and Canada.

Use of funds

The LDS Church reports that it uses most of its financial resources to construct and maintain buildings and other facilities. The church also spends its funds on providing social welfare and relief and supporting missionary, educational, and other church-sponsored programs. Additionally, mission presidents, who serve full-time in these capacities, can receive compensation from the church in the form of housing, living allowances, and other benefits while they are on assignment. No funds are provided for services rendered.

Construction of facilities
The LDS Church builds additional chapels (structures used for weekly worship and for baptisms) and temples (structures used for eternal marriage and ordinances) as wards and branches of the church are organized. The church built about 40 smaller temples between 1998 and 2001.  (See List of temples of the Church of Jesus Christ of Latter-day Saints.)

Maintenance of facilities
The LDS Church pays to maintain its chapels and temples around the world. These costs include repairs, utilities, grounds maintenance, and specialized custodial work. Members also assist with cleaning local chapels by providing general custodial work. These facilities are cost-centers for the church, and maintaining them represents a significant use of the church's funds. The materials used in church classes and the budgets to run activities and other things done by the various congregations of the church are also centrally funded. It also funds the printing and distribution of manuals for classes, and funds all congregational activities through centralized budgeting.

Social welfare and relief

The LDS Church operates a welfare distribution system, as it encourages members to seek financial assistance from family and the church first before seeking public or state-sponsored welfare. AgReserves Inc., Deseret Cattle and Citrus Ranch, and Farmland Reserve, Inc. are part of its welfare distribution system. Welfare resources are distributed by local bishops but maintained by the Presiding Bishopric. It also sends relief aid to victims of earthquakes, tsunamis, hurricanes and other natural disasters around the world. The relief effort has been recognized through many organizations and political leaders, including the United States leaders in reaction to the Hurricane Katrina relief effort by the church.

Education
The LDS Church uses donations to support all, or part, of the Church Educational System (CES).  As part of CES, the church owns, operates, and subsidizes education at Brigham Young University, BYU–Idaho, BYU–Hawaii, and Ensign College.  These four institutions of higher education provide religious education, for both church members and those of other faiths, in addition to regular university and college-level degree programs.

CES also includes the seminary program for secondary students (typically, ages 14–18), and institutes of religion for post-secondary students and adult learners. In 2011, approximately 730,000 individuals were enrolled in seminary and institute programs in 147 countries. CES courses of study are separate from religious instruction provided through church congregations.

The church also operates a handful of elementary and secondary schools in the Pacific Islands and Mexico.

Other programs
The LDS Church also spends tithing funds collected on missionary, youth, and other programs which the church considers to be within its mission. Although the families of LDS missionaries (usually young men ages 18–25 or young women above age 19) generally pay US$400 a month for missions, general church funds are used to assist those who need additional support to pay for their missions. This monthly family contribution will increase to US$500 on July 1, 2020. Church members may donate to assist in supporting these missionaries.  Additionally, the church provides a mission office and mission home for each of its 399 missions and pays for television advertising offering free copies of the Book of Mormon, the Bible, and church-produced videos and DVDs.  The cost of printing or producing these materials is covered by the church and the materials are distributed for free. Throughout the world, it has historically supported Scouting programs for young men (although that relationship is concluding at the end of 2019) and a youth organization for young women.  The church also runs a large family history organization which collects records of genealogical import from many archives worldwide and allows online family tree collaboration.  It also creates and publishes curriculum and audio/video (church films, etc.), and has a "church history" establishment to collect and preserve record of the church.

Volunteer labor
The LDS Church tempers its cash expenses through the use of volunteer labor. In 1995, the church's human resources department estimated that the 96,484 volunteers serving at the time contributed services having an annual value of $360 million. This data did not include those serving as full-time church missionaries.

Assets 

Time magazine estimated in 1996 that the church's assets exceeded $30 billion. This figure represents only one side of the balance sheet and does not include current liabilities for maintenance, although the LDS Church incurs virtually no long-term liabilities. After the Time article was published, the church responded that the financial figures in the article were "grossly exaggerated." Three years later, annual revenues were estimated to be $5 billion, with total assets at $25 to $30 billion. Whatever the actual figure, some estimate that about two-thirds of it is made up of non-income-producing facilities and the land they sit on, including temples and thousands of meetinghouses the church operates worldwide, as well as educational institutions, such as Brigham Young University. The remaining assets include direct investments in for-profit businesses largely managed through Deseret Management Corporation. Although the church is a tax-exempt organization, its for-profit entities generate "unrelated business income" that is subject to federal, state, and local income and other taxes.

Officially the church states that its commercial businesses make a "relatively small" amount of money and are "primarily an outgrowth of enterprises which were begun when the Church was isolated in the West.  The commercial businesses owned by the Church help serve the needs of the Church in accomplishing its mission."

Ensign Peak Advisors

Ensign Peak Advisors, Inc. (Ensign) was founded as the church's investment division in the 1960s and was still considered to be a "shoestring operation" into the 1990s. By 2020, it managed about $100 billion in assets.

In 2019, a former employee of Ensign made a whistleblower report to the IRS alleging that the church held over $100 billion of assets in a large investment fund. The whistleblower further alleged that the church-operated fund failed to use its revenues for charitable purposes and instead used them in for-profit ventures; and that it misled contributors and the public about the usage and extent of those funds. According to the whistleblower, applicable law requires the funds be used for religious, educational or other charitable purposes for the fund to maintain its tax-exempt status. If confirmed, the $100 billion net worth would exceed the combined net worths of the world's largest university endowment (Harvard University) and the world's largest philanthropic foundation (Gates Foundation). Other commentators have argued that such expenditures may not be legally required as claimed.

In response to the allegations, the church's First Presidency stated that "the Church complies with all applicable law governing our donations, investments, taxes, and reserves," and that "a portion" of funds received by the church are "methodically safeguarded through wise financial management and the building of a prudent reserve for the future."

2023 SEC Investigation and penalty

In February 2023, the U.S. Securities and Exchange Commision (SEC) found that Ensign and the church had used 13 different shell LLCs across the United States to avoid disclosing an increase in their investment portfolio value from $7 billion to approximately $37.8 billion from 1997 to 2019. As a result, Ensign was penalized $4 million and the church was penalized $1 million. The existence of the shell companies were made public in 2018 by the website Mormon Leaks who noticed that the shell company websites were hosted on LDS Church servers.

Deseret Ranches

Deseret Cattle and Citrus Ranch east of Orlando, Florida, the world's largest beef ranch, is located on over 670,000 acres (1,046 mi²) in Florida. The land is worth an estimated $858 million (as of 1997). The ranch maintains a herd of approximately 45,000 beef cattle, and over 200,000 citrus trees.

The ranch is home to more than 350 species of wildlife, including almost 250 species of birds. Sandhill cranes and the threatened wood stork flourish in the area. Other species of wildlife include white-tailed deer, American alligator, Osceola turkey, wild hog, Florida bass and nesting bald eagles. The ranch has created and manages one of the state’s largest wood stork rookeries, a breeding ground for the threatened birds.

The church has plans to develop a large portion of the ranch into more than a dozen neighborhoods for approximately half a million residents.

Additional holdings
The following is a partial list of assets known to be owned or controlled by the LDS Church:

 AgReserves - the largest producer of nuts in the United States (circa. 1997)
 Beneficial Financial Group - An insurance and financial services company with assets of $3.1 billion.
 Bonneville International - the 14th largest radio chain in the U.S.
 Deseret News - a weekly Utah newspaper and digital news operation, second-largest in the state of Utah.
 Farmland Reserve Inc. - 228,000 acres (923 km²) in Nebraska,; 51,600 acres in Osage County, Oklahoma; 
 Hawaii Reserves, Inc. - Miscellaneous church holdings in Hawaii. When combined with the Polynesian Cultural Center (the leading paid visitor attraction in Hawaii) and Brigham Young University-Hawaii, LDS Church-related entities generated revenue of $260 million for the Hawaii economy in 2005.

See also 

 Deseret Industries
 Deseret Manufacturing Company
 Utah Property Management Associates
 Utah-Idaho Sugar Company
 Zions Bancorporation
 Zion's Central Board of Trade
 LDS Charities

Notes

Further reading

Economy and Christianity
Tithing in Mormonism